The 2006 Maine gubernatorial election took place on November 7, 2006. Incumbent Democrat John Baldacci was re-elected to his second term.  This was the last time a Democrat won statewide office in Maine until 2018, when Janet Mills won the gubernatorial election over Republican Shawn Moody.

In the general election, Baldacci, Woodcock, Green Independent Party candidate Pat LaMarche, and independents Barbara Merrill and Phillip Morris Napier appeared on the ballot.

Democratic primary

Candidates
 John Baldacci, incumbent Governor of Maine
 Christopher Miller, internet service provider

Results

Republican primary

Candidates
 Dave Emery, former U.S. Representative
 Peter Mills, State Senator
 Chandler Woodcock, State Senator

Results

Green Independent Party
Pat LaMarche, businesswoman, nominee for Governor in 1998 and nominee for Vice President of the United States in 2004

Independents
Barbara Merrill, State Representative
Phillip Morris Napier, 2002 candidate for Governor

General election

Predictions

Polling

Results

References

External links
Official campaign websites (Archived)
John Baldacci for Governor
Chandler Woodcock for Governor
Bruce Fleming for Governor
Alex Hammer for Governor
Barbara Merrill for Governor
Phillip Morris NaPier for Governor
David Jones for Governor

See also
 U.S. gubernatorial elections, 2006
 United States Senate election in Maine, 2006

Governor
2006
Maine